Tell Aran (also spelled, Tell Arn; ancient Arne) is a Kurdish-majority town in northern Syria, administratively part of the al-Safira District of the Aleppo Governorate, located southeast of Aleppo close to Sabkhat al-Jabbul. Nearby localities include Tell Hasil, al-Nayrab and Tell Shughayb to the northwest and al-Safira to the southeast. According to the Syria Central Bureau of Statistics (CBS), Tell Aran had a population of 17,767 in the 2004 census. The town is famous for its grapes, vineyards and gardens.
The number of residents of Talaar has exceeded 60,000, especially after the large numbers of people displaced from the city of Aleppo to it due to the bloody war in Syria.  The affairs of the town of Talaran are managed through its municipality, which is elected by members of the Baath Party. Muhammad Shadi Murad is currently heading the municipality of Talaran, succeeding Mr. Haitham Hamam.

History
It is believed to be the site of the ancient Iron Age settlement of Arne. Arne was first inhabited by the Arameans, and served as the first royal capital of the Aramaean kingdom of Bit Agusi. The kingdom of Bit Agusi stretched from the Azaz area in the north to Hamath in the south, and was established by Gus of Yahan in the 9th-century BCE.

In Assyrian records, the city is observed as the seat of Arame, son of the founder of the kingdom. It was sacked by the Assyrian king Shalmaneser III in 849 BC during one of his campaigns in the west, as attested by a bronze band found at Balawat. After the city's sacking, Arpad (modern Tell Rifaat) became the capital of the kingdom of Bit Agusi. Excavations at the site produced pottery corresponding to human occupation during the Iron Age II, but not Iron Age I. Tell Aran is also possibly the site of a major battle between the Egyptian king Thutmose III and a Mitannian army which ended with a crushing defeat to the king of Mitanni.

References

Bibliography

Populated places in al-Safira District
Iron Age sites in Syria
Aramean cities
Archaeological sites in Aleppo Governorate